Joseph A. Buckhalter Jr. (August 1, 1937 – December 30, 2013) was an American retired basketball player.

He played collegiately for Tennessee State University.

He was selected by the St. Louis Hawks in the 12th round (81st pick overall) of the 1958 NBA draft.

He played for the Cincinnati Royals (1961–63) in the NBA.

He also played with the Harlem Globetrotters.

References

External links

1937 births
2013 deaths
Cincinnati Royals players
Harlem Globetrotters players
Power forwards (basketball)
St. Louis Hawks draft picks
Tennessee State Tigers basketball players
Wilkes-Barre Barons players
American men's basketball players
Basketball players from Chicago